is a contemporary Japanese artist.

Yukinori Yanagi is a contemporary Japanese artist who has addressed themes of national and transnational sovereignty, globalization and borders, as well as Japan’s imperial history and nationalism. He is considered one of the first postwar Japanese artists that is openly critical of Japanese society and governmental policy. Many of Yanagi’s artworks consists of large-scale, site-specific installations that engage with movement and symbols of nationalism.

Yanagi has exhibited his artworks widely in Japan and the United States, and became among the first foreign artists living in New York to be invited to exhibit at the Whitney Biennial, alongside Cai Guo-Qiang, in 2000. His artworks are in museum collections such as the Museum of Modern Art (USA), Tate Modern (UK), Virginia Museum of Fine Art (USA) and the Fabric Workshop and Museum (USA). His vision for the revitalization of the island of Inujima was actualized as the Inujima Seirensho Art Museum in 2008, a permanent, six-part art installation that has become an integral location of the Setouchi International Art Triennale.

Early life and education in Japan

Early life 
Yanagi was born and raised in a rural region of Fukuoka, Japan. Growing up in the prefecture closest to the Korean Peninsula allowed Yanagi to grow up with a distinct awareness of the existence of other nations and cultures. He has spoken of his childhood experiences of picking up ‘everyday objects’ marked with Korean hangul that had washed up on the shore from the Sea of Japan as the beginning of his long-term interest in transpacific and transnational boundaries and movement.

Like many Japanese people of his generation, Yanagi's family was part of the Empire of Japan's Pacific War war effort. An awareness of this familial history has informed the artist's body of work: his father was a fighter pilot, and his paternal grandfather worked in border control in Japan’s former colony Manchukuo and was detained for more than a decade in Siberia and China following Japan’s surrender. In his artwork, Yanagi considers continuity and diversity with regards to his own position and the place of the Japanese nation within this tumultuous history.

Growing up in the 1960s before the development of widespread video games, Yanagi's childhood activities involved playing with insects in the countryside, especially ants and bagworm moths, and creating things out of various materials such as concrete and wax from a hardware store owned by one of his relatives. Furthermore, Yanagi’s uncle was avant-garde artist Miyazaki Junnosuke, a member of Kyushu-ha, which meant Yanagi was accustomed to seeing artistic objects and sculptures from an early age.

Education and early career in Tokyo 
Yanagi earned both a BA and MFA in painting from Musashino Art University in Western Tokyo (1985).

He was interested in the work of artists from the Mono-ha generation, especially of Noriyuki Haraguchi’s industrial sculptures, and became increasingly restless within the conventions of the University’s painting department. Despite being told that graduation work must be limited to flat works and oil paint only, Yanagi created a sculpture out of wooden supports and was subsequently excluded from the graduate thesis exhibition at the Metropolitan Museum of Tokyo. For his first solo exhibition the following year he burned all the artworks he made in art school and exhibited the ashes in large wooden boxes as the installation Ground Transport Project (1985). It was in this installation that Yanagi first included the element of live ants, a characteristic that he became known for throughout the 1990s.

From 1986, Yanagi began to exhibit artwork that addressed issues of “movement” from the perspective of an outsider of the art world’s system. This included his installation Ground Transposition (1987) that included large, spherical sculptures that were scaled to the human form in relation to the proportions to the size of dung beetles and the ball of dung that they roll as part of their ecology. The proportional scaling was a reference to the ancient Egyptian symbolism of the dung beetle as a ‘steward of the sun’ tasked with physically pushing the weight of the sun across the sky each day, which for Yanagi was a direct reference to the rising sun of the Japanese flag and the weight of Japanese nationalism that the artist felt. In the late 1980s Yanagi exhibited his work at various galleries in Tokyo, Kanagawa, and Fukuoka, including a prominent solo exhibition held at the Hillside Gallery in Daikanyama, in which he executed a smoky performance piece entitled I Feel Yellow (1987). He was awarded the Excellence Award in Art Document from the Tochigi Prefectural Museum of Fine Arts in 1987.

Move to the United States 
Despite the promising trajectory of his art career in Tokyo following his graduation, Yanagi was increasingly disillusioned with the Japanese art world, describing his feeling of “being trapped in a giant Japanese flag, in a cage, engulfed by national identity.” The artist moved to United States in 1988 to earn an MFA from the Sculpture Department of the Graduate School of Yale School of Art (1990), where he studied under Vito Acconci and Frank Gehry, among others.

At Yale, Yanagi started to expand on his engagement with Japanese nationalism and history after having the opportunity to read the works of prominent prewar Japanese intellectuals such as Nishida Kitarō and Kuki Shūzō, as well as texts and documents from or about the Pacific War that were difficult to access in Japan but available in the US. These studies allowed the young artist to gain a fuller picture of World War II, and question the omissions and identitarian narratives of both the Japanese and American perspectives of their national wartime history. He began to engage seriously with the idea of "wandering as a permanent position," creating artworks to dissolve the fixity of symbols associated with nations and regions, attempting to account for the changes that occur through time and circumstance.

Ants and national boundaries – late 1980s–1990s

Artworks from Yale University, 1988–1989 
In the first year of his MFA at Yale University, Yanagi began thinking about the figure of the wandering ant as a multifaceted allegory for transnational movement. He began to regularly incorporate the insects into his artworks, a live element that became emblematic of Yanagi’s body of work from the 1990s. He thought of the ant colony as a perfectly organized communal society—exemplary on the one hand of a blind obedience, but also reflective of an unstoppable ecosystem of working parts that could surpass and dismantle any concept of national boundaries or borders.

Yanagi came up with the Ant Following Plan (1988) at the end of his first semester, in which he tracked the wandering movements of a single ant on the dark floor of his mostly empty 5-by-9-meter studio space using thick red chalk. Shortly after, he debuted American Flag Ant Farm (1989), which he crafted from an Uncle Milton toy ant farm by adding an extra panel with sand colored to appear as the American flag. The ‘wandering’ ants created tunnels that disintegrated the stars and stripes of the flag, overlaying macro and micro elements (nation vs ant) to dismantle and critique the permanence of the symbol of American national unity.

These earlier works would prove to be very impactful, informing much Yanagi’s works for the next ten years. He continued working on and expanding his ‘Ant Farm Series’ from 1990-2002. He also resurfaced the ‘ant following’ technique in 1994 for his ongoing series ‘Wandering Position’ (1994–Present)’ in which he performs site-specific live tracings of a wandering ant (San Diego, California in 1994; Alcatraz, California, 1996; Anomaly Gallery, Tokyo, 2021). He also uses this technique to create more conventional works for traditional gallery spaces on large format papers and copper plates.

Following his graduation from Yale, Yanagi moved to New York where he started to work internationally.

World Flag Ant Farm (1990) 
In 1991, Yanagi exhibited World Flag Ant Farm (1990) at Los Angeles’s LACE (Los Angeles Contemporary Exhibitions) in one of the prominent solo exhibitions that launched his international career. World Flag Ant Farm was a large-scale installation consisting of 180 national ‘flags’ representing the members of the United Nations at the time. Each ‘flag’ was made out of a plastic box filled with colored sand in the pattern of the flag. They are interconnected by plastic tubes as they hung on the wall. As the title suggests, the entire artwork functioned as a multitude of interconnected ant colonies which could be viewed through the plastic by audiences. As the tiny insects tunneled through each flag and carried colored grains of sand to other areas, the colors and signs of national unity intermixed and began to dissolve the individual flags, creating a blurred image of a single, more ambiguous flag.

World Flag Ant Farm was well received and Yanagi's approach was considered ‘iconic’ especially in the context of the end of the Cold War and rising globalization and postcolonial studies, even being featured on the cover of the international art magazine Art in America, despite also facing harsh criticism from animal rights activists. The constant ‘wandering’ of the ants through each national symbol was exemplary of Yanagi’s ongoing engagement with the often muddled processes of globalization, the crossing of transnational borders, the diasporic movement of peoples, and the ultimate precarity of nationhood, race, and identity. Yanagi has said that he personally identifies with the piece, that it is related to the “borders I have had to cross or barriers I have confronted in trying to define myself as a Japanese.” The World Flag Ant Farm was exhibited at the 45th Venice Biennale in 1993, where Yanagi became the first Japanese artist to be awarded the Aperto Award as an emerging artist. In 1992, with the aid of the Asian Cultural Council, Yanagi was invited to the International Studio Program at PS1 Contemporary Art Center in New York.

This artwork marked the maturation of Yanagi’s ant farm idea and the beginning of a long series of Ant Farm Projects in which colonies of ants would slowly dissolve symbols of nationalism, including flags, currency, and American art. World Flag Ant Farm (1990) is in the collection of the Benesse House, Naoshima Contemporary Art Museum, Naoshima.

Ant Farm Project series (1990–2002) 
Yanagi produced many more flag-based ant farm projects with a wide variety of different geopolitical combinations in the years following his debut of World Flag Ant Farm (1990), while living in New York but traveling to Japan regularly. Some of the largest ant farm installations he made after World Flag Ant Farm include: The World Flag Ant Farm 1991 -Asia- (1991); America (1994), connecting all nations of North and South America; Asia-Pacific Ant Farm (1995); and Eurasia (2001). Some of the more political pieces he produced included: The 38th Parallel (1991) connecting North and South Korea; Pacific - the Ant Farm Project (1996), connecting Japan and the U.S.; Union Jack Ant Farm (1994), encompassing the former British Empire; DMZ (1995) connecting North and South Korea and an ambiguous zone between them that alluded to the DMZ; and 2 China (1997), connecting China and Taiwan.

Pacific - the Ant Farm Project (1996) gained particular traction in art and academic circles and is now in the Tate Museum’s collection. To create it, Yanagi not only included the countries that border the Pacific Ocean, but also the nations that once had colonies in the Pacific, as well as indigenous groups like the Māori of New Zealand that have still not regained sovereignty over their territories. As such, the work challenged ‘neutral’ regional histories and symbols of sovereignty, instead engaging with the history of violent contestation in the Asia Pacific region.

Money series (1999–2002) 
In the later 1990s, Yanagi also began to create ant farm projects that engaged with a variety of national currencies, creating installations centering on large-scale motifs of American, Japanese, European, and other bills. Some works include In God We Trust (1999), Dollar Pyramid (2000), Yukichi KV644955H (2002), and Euro Circuit (2002). Euro Circuit consisted of 12 ant colony units, one to represent the highest value of cash currency for each country that originally joined the European Union. As the ants tunnel through the installation, the distinctive currencies gradually dissolve into a ‘universal’ banknote, demonstrating Yanagi’s reflections on the possibilities of a world becoming more and more transnational.

Imperial symbolism and Article 9 – 1990s

Hinomaru series (1990–1992) 
From the early 1990s, Yanagi also produced a series of sculptures and site-specific installations that aimed to deconstruct the nationalist ideology of modern Japan through the motif of the Hinomaru, or the Japanese flag. The first of these works, Hi-no-maru 1/36 was produced for his first solo exhibition in New York at the alternative space STOREFRONT for Art and Architecture in 1990. Hi-no-maru 1/36 (1990) was designed with consideration to STOREFRONT’s unique, triangular exhibition space. Positioned in a 10-part radial corner, Yanagi created an infinity mirror using reflections on opposing walls of angled mirrors in order to produce the illusion of one red circle with radiating beams, a direct reference to the flag adopted by the Japanese imperial army during the Pacific War. This work was exhibited alongside American Flag Ant Farm (1989), becoming a New York debut that demonstrated Yanagi’s ongoing engagement with the instability of national borders and his own ‘entrapment within mobility.’

One particularly acclaimed piece from this series is Banzai Corner (1991). For this work, Yanagi arranged rows of red Ultraman and Ultra Seven toy figurines into an arc with their bodies facing a mirrored corner to produce the image of a red circle. The uniforms of the toys create an illusion that once again alludes to the radiating beams of the Japanese Empire’s military flag. Each character has been carefully arranged so that its right arm is raised in the air to imply a victorious ‘Banzai’ in praise of the hinomaru, but viewers can see that in reality the figurines only celebrate their own reflection. Yanagi’s use of Ultraman and Ultra Seven figurines for this artwork has been attributed to the Okinawan identity of the character’s creator, Tetsuo Kinjō, who grew up during the American occupation of Okinawa. For Yanagi, the idea of alienation and otherness in Japan does not only refer to foreign nations, but also “to people living in Japan—Korean, Chinese, native Ainu, and Okinawans.”

Yanagi also produced a billboard-sized neon work, Hinomaru Illumination (1992) which was exhibited at his solo exhibition at the Benesse House, Naoshima Contemporary Art Museum, Kagawa in 1993; Art Market Fuji Television Gallery in 2001; as the central window artwork for the seminal exhibition “Japanese Art After 1945: Scream Against the Sky” at the Guggenheim Museum SoHo in 1994; as well as again at his solo exhibition “Akitsushima” at the Hiroshima City Museum of Contemporary Art in 2001. This neon work is visually related to other Japanese neo-pop artists of the early 1990s, but it also exposes the “feeble foundation of national illusion” of national symbols that are harnessed when convenient—a symbol that can be turned ‘on’ and ‘off’ at will. For example, for Amaterasu and Haniwa (1993) the neon flag was exhibited in the context of the Shinto Sun Goddess Amaterasu, alongside haniwa clay figurines that harken to the Kofun or Yamato period that has been associated with Japanese cultural origin. In addition, for Hinomaru Container (1992) Yanagi created another space of mirrored illusion within a shipping container shaped like an ancient tumulus (kofun) but cumulating with a refracted neon Yen symbol (¥), critiquing the conflation of consumerism and identity.

Chrysanthemum Carpet (1994) 
Yanagi explicitly problematized the Greater East Asian Co-Prosperity Sphere and its legacy in his work The Chrysanthemum Carpet (1994), first exhibited at Yanagi's solo exhibition at the Peter Blum Gallery in New York in 1995. The artwork consists of a large, red carpet designed to look like a Japanese passport. It included an outline of the trademark chrysanthemum flower that is the Imperial Seal of Japan, but with only one of its golden petals attached and the remaining 15 scattered around the expanse of the carpet. Black text woven into the carpet stands out starkly against the red background, reading “he loves me, he loves me not” in the languages of the Asian countries once dominated by Japan under the proclaimed Greater East Asian Co-Prosperity Sphere. On the underside of the carpet, hidden from view, Yanagi inscribed texts from three distinctive sections of the Japanese Constitution: Article 19 (Freedom of thought), Article 20 (Freedom of religion), and Article 21 (Freedom of speech, press, and expression). Besides directly confronting the debate about national memory loss and historical revisionism regarding the war period, by juxtaposing the visible imperial symbol with the obstructed democratic constitutional guarantees hidden below, Yanagi's installation pointed to the structural contradictions of Japan's modernization. The Meiji Constitution that marked Japan's emergence as a modern nation state both restored the absolutism of the Japanese Emperor system as well as established a democracy, and furthermore Japan's postwar constitution was established by the U.S. Occupation forces. The artist's choice to obstruct the democratic principles from view on the underside of the carpet alludes to the subtle continuity of the survival of the Japanese emperor system, even in the postwar.

In the exhibition space, Yanagi's red carpet led to an Occupation-era photograph of SCAP General Douglas MacArthur standing with Emperor Hirohito, captioned as Chrysanthemum and Sword with a quote by poet and novelist Mishima Yukio superimposed in red, reading “Why should his Imperial Majesty become human?” This inclusion evokes criticisms of the continuities and discontinuities of Japanese sovereignty ‘before’ and ‘after’ of the Pacific War, implicating the resilience of Japanese nationalism as well as the American occupation of Japan decades later. About this work, the artist stated, ""All these people died for the emperor because they thought he was a god, and it turned out that he was just a small man with a human voice." Yanagi's carpet and the historical photograph have been installed together for several exhibitions together in the 1990s, including at the Art Tower Mito Contemporary Art Center in Ibaraki and the National Gallery of Australia in Canberra, both of which also included war paintings from the Pacific War as part of the installation.

In 1997, Yanagi created a smaller version of the Chrysanthemum Carpet as limited edition multiple entitled Loves Me/Loves Me Not (1997) during his residency at the Fabric Workshop and Museum in Philadelphia, Pennsylvania.

"Project Article 9" Exhibition, 1995 
In 1995, 50 years after the end of World War II, Yanagi became the first artist to specifically address Article 9 of the Japanese Constitution, which renounced Japan’s ability to wage war after the end of World War II. To mark the significance of the year, the Queens Museum in New York hosted Yanagi’s solo show entitled “Project Article 9.” For this exhibition, Yanagi produced a series of textual installations that focused explicitly on the Article 9 clause in the postwar Japanese constitution. He modified a photograph of SCAP General Douglas MacArthur standing with Emperor Hirohito (the same photo utilized in his Chrysanthemum Carpet installation) and prepared two new large-scale installation artworks, Forbidden Box (1995) and Article 9 (1995).

Yanagi superimposed a historical photo of SCAP General Douglas MacArthur and Emperor Hirohito standing together with the full text of Article 9 of Japan’s Constitution in three different forms: the draft version originally written by MacArthur, the finalized Japanese version, and its English translation. According to the Queens Museum’s executive director Carma C. Fauntleroy, Yanagi’s concentration on textual elements and translation led "viewer[s] to reflect on the vagaries of communication through language and its implications in national and international arenas.”

Yanagi utilized his residency at the Fabric Workshop and Museum in Philadelphia, Pennsylvania to create The Forbidden Box (1995) for the exhibition. The installation was made from two large-scale sheets of sheer nylon voile fabric, with screenprints of the giant mushroom cloud that occurred when the United States dropped the atomic bomb on the city of Hiroshima in 1945. In addition to the image, the 17-foot-long sheets of fabric also depict the text from Article 9, with the version originally written by MacArthur printed on the rear sheet, and the English translation of the Japanese version in the front, intended as a way for viewers to see the differences in the rhetoric between the United States and Japan. Like a cloud of smoke, the sheets of fabric seem to billow out from a lead box that had the words “Little Boy,” the name of the atomic bomb, inscribed on the lid. Yanagi has stated that he included the box as a way to bring together two folktales, the Japanese children’s folktale of Urashima Tarō and the Greek myth of Pandora’s Box. On this, Yanagi stated, “universality of children’s tales enables us to know that we, as a species, share common core values and hopes all around the globe.” The mythologies of the box parallel Yanagi’s allegory for Japan that at once acknowledges Japan’s victimization in the aftermath of the atomic bombs but also the nation’s own role as a colonial aggressor in the Asia Pacific — the Pandora’s box revealed a hope for a future world with no more victims of nuclear warfare.

Yanagi also produced a large-scale neon light installation entitled simply “Article 9” for the exhibition, consisting of a set of neon signs encased in plastic box frames that spelled out the Japanese version of Article 9. However, the neon signs were disassembled, seemingly cast off in a pile of disjointed, glowing red parts incomprehensible as a whole. They cast red light around the exhibition space onto Yanagi's other works.

Yanagi’s artworks from the “Project Article 9” show went on to be exhibited in Japan at the Kirin Plaza Osaka in 1995. Forbidden Box and Article 9 were also included more than 10 years later in Japanese curator Watanabe Shinya’s exhibition “Into the Atomic Sunshine” amongst works by other artists that engaged with Japan’s war history at Hillside Gallery in Daikanyama in 2008, Puffin Room in New York in 2008, and the Okinawa Prefectural Museum & Art Museum in 2009.

Inujima Project - 2000s–present

Inujima Seirensho Art Museum 
In 1992, Yanagi was invited to hold a solo exhibition at the brand new Naoshima Contemporary Art Museum (now Benesse House at Benesse Art Site Naoshima). He fell in love with Naoshima and the Seto Inland Sea, returning many times from his studio in Japan in the years following, searching for an opportunity to start a long term project in the area that addressed the harmful scars that the rapid industrialization of Japan had left on the beautiful region during the Meiji Period. After three years of looking for an appropriate site, Yanagi came across Okayama Prefecture’s Inujima in 1995, a depopulated island scattered with the ruins of a copper refinery dating back to the industrial Meiji Period, and the inspiration for Yanagi's Inujima Project was formed.

In 1995, Yanagi came up with his vision for the revitalization of the entire island of Inujima; he aimed to revamp the long-defunct copper '"seirensho" (refinery) as a permanent, site-specific artwork using renewable energy, a project that was realized with the support from Benesse Corporation’s CEO at the time, Soichiro Fukutake. Yanagi and Fukutake were able to acquire Mishima Yukio's 'Shōtō House,' the former residence of the novelist and poet whose work Yanagi had engaged with in his artworks throughout the previous decade. Using dismantled and reconstructed parts of Mishima's residence, Yanagi spent years building a series of installations entitled Hero Dry Cell (2008) within the copper refinery, creating a permanent artwork that was also fused with the architectural heritage of the industrial site.

After 13 years of collaborative work, Yanagi's Inujima Art Project was opened in 2008 as the Inujima Seirensho Art Museum. The Inujima Seirensho Art Museum has become a forerunner of the Setouchi International Art Triennale, a contemporary art festival that takes place across the islands in the Seto Inland Sea. In 2010, the inaugural Setouchi International Art Triennale featured three installations created by Yanagi in collaboration with architect Kazuyo Sejima, in addition to the Injuma Seirensho Art Museum

Due to his long term project in Japan, Yanagi began traveling often between his studios in New York and Inujima, and eventually the artist closed his studios in the United States to move back to Japan full time. He set up in a self-designed studio situated on the north face of the mountains facing the Genkai Sea, in Itoshima City, Fukuoka prefecture. In 2005, he began working as an associate professor in the Faculty of Art at Hiroshima City University. He started a Contemporary Art and Theory Major in the Faculty of Arts and launched the Hiroshima Art Project, utilizing facilities that were unused due to the exposure to radiation as sites to exhibit artworks.

Hero Dry Cell (2008) 
Inside the defunct copper refinery that makes up the Inujima Seirensho Art Museum, Yanagi spent more than a decade constructing a six-part permanent art installation entitled Hero Dry Cell (2008) that utilized mirrors, natural light, local stones, water elements, and architectural collage to create an interconnected, multi-layered installation about the modernization of Japan and legacy of the postwar.

Hero Dry Cell is made up of six parts that unfold inside the museum "like a hand scroll" in the following order: Icarus Cell, Solar Rock, Slag Note, Mirror Note, Icarus Tower, and Solar Note. The second part, Solar Rock (2008) is of particular interest, using a natural light leak to create the illusion of a total eclipse—a black hinomaru. A black half shadow circle is created with light and then reflected in a dark pool of water gathered below on a large slab of local Inujima granite, creating the illusion of a full circle of a Black Sun rising, perhaps another addition to Yanagi's Hinomaru Series that critiqued the imperial-era nationalism associated with the Japanese flag. The granite megalith embedded into the ground of Solar Rock can be connected to Yanagi's keen interest in the Mono-ha movement. In front of the black hinomaru, Yanagi's 'architectural collage' appeared to float in mid-air as deconstructed panels of a tatami-mat room from Mishima Yukio's former residence lined up perfectly in alignment to lead the viewers' eye into the shadowy abyss of the Black Sun, even as the windows catch light and dazzle the retina simultaneously. This sensation is similarly described by the artist himself when recounting his first morning on Inujima in 1995: the rising sun made an "imprint on his retina" that developed into this six-part installation which functions an "after-image of the sun he saw that first morning."

Recent years, 2010–present 
After the completion of the Inujima Project, Yanagi has taken on more revitalization projects, such as the challenge of transforming an old junior high school on the remote island of Momoshima Island in Hiroshima Prefecture, establishing ART BASE MOMOSHIMA in the Onomichi Channel area in 2012.

In 2016, Yanagi’s large-scale solo exhibition at Yokohama’s BankART1929 explored the past three decades of the artist's oeuvre, filling the entire museum. He unveiled a new installation work, Project God-zilla (2016), an anti-nuclear work about the Fukushima Daiichi nuclear disaster of 2011.

Notable artwork and public collections
World Flag Ant Farm (1990) - Benesse House, Naoshima Contemporary Art Museum, Naoshima

Banzai Corner (1991) - Fukutake Foundation, Japan

Hinomaru Illumination (1992) - The Museum of Art, Kochi, Japan

Hinomaru Container - Yamato Tumulus Type (1992) - Museum of Contemporary Art Tokyo

Chrysanthemum Carpet (1994) - National Gallery of Australia

Article 9 (1994)

The Forbidden Box (1995) - The Fabric Workshop and Museum, Philadelphia, USA

Pacific - The Ant Farm Project - (1996) - Tate Modern, United Kingdom

Dollar Pyramid (2000) - Virginia Museum of Fine Arts

Inujima Seirensho Art Museum (2008) - Fukutake Foundation, Japan

See also
Shimada Yoshiko

Mono-ha

Yukio Mishima

Vito Acconci

Frank Gehry

Soichiro Fukutake

Jasper Jones

Venice Biennale

References

External links
 Inujima Seirensho Art Museum
 ART BASE MOMOSHIMA

1959 births
Living people
Japanese emigrants to the United States
Japanese contemporary artists
Yale School of Art alumni
21st-century American artists
21st-century Japanese artists
20th-century American artists
20th-century Japanese artists
People from Fukuoka
Artists from Fukuoka Prefecture
Censorship in Asia
Censorship in Japan
Japanese activists
Japanese installation artists